The 2001 Grozny Mil Mi-8 crash in Chechnya killed 13 Russian military personnel, mostly senior military officers including two generals.

On September 17, 2001, a surface-to-air missile fired by a special Chechen group targeting Russian commanders downed a VIP Mil Mi-8 helicopter over Grozny, killing Major-General Anatoly Pozdnyakov, member of the General Staff of the Russian Armed Forces, Major-General Pavel Varfolomeyev, deputy director of staff of the Ministry of Defence of Russia, eight Colonels (Igor Abramov, Igor Khakhalkin, Yuri Makhov, Vladimir Smolennikov, Sergei Toryanik, Nikolai Lyubimsky, Igor Tribuntsov and Vladimir Talayev), and three crewmembers.

In 2005, four members of a group called "Ichkeria defense" were sentenced for the downing of the aircraft.

According to an alternative version, described by Anna Politkovskaya, the helicopter was downed by corrupt Russian forces.
According to Politkovskaya:

References

External links
Russian Officers Are Killed in Helicopter Crash in Chechnya
Top Russians die in Chechnya crash

2001 disasters in Russia
Aviation accidents and incidents in 2001
History of Grozny
Helicopter crashes of the Second Chechen War
Accidents and incidents involving the Mil Mi-8
Mass murder in 2001
September 2001 events in Russia
Aviation accidents and incidents in Russia